Jonathan Daly (born January 14, 1942) is an American actor who is known in America for his roles in Petticoat Junction, The Jimmy Stewart Show, and C.P.O. Sharkey, and best known in Australia for being in the comedy duo "Delo & Daly".

Delo & Daly

In the 1960s, Daly formed the comedy team "Delo & Daly" with Ken Delo (later of The Lawrence Welk Show). They became friends while in the US Army, and began by performing at military shows. They became quite popular in Australia. They appeared as guests on In Melbourne Tonight, which was similar to America's Tonight Show, and later had their own Australian television variety show The Delo and Daly Show (1963–64),  which featured Australian and American performers. Daly also hosted the television interview show Daly at Night in Melbourne.

American television

Daly first appeared on American television in guest roles in such series as Bewitched, The Flying Nun, and The Ghost & Mrs. Muir. His first regular character role was in Petticoat Junction, where he played game warden Orrin Pike, the love interest of Bobbie Jo Bradley (played by Lori Saunders). He later starred as Jimmy Stewart's adult son Peter Howard in The Jimmy Stewart Show, and as Don Rickles' immediate superior officer Lieutenant Whipple in the 1970s series C.P.O. Sharkey.<ref>Barrett, Michael "'The Jimmy Stewart Show' Emerges from TV's Never-Never Land" February 24, 2015 Popmatters.com retrieved October 21, 2015</ref> Daly has more recently appeared in Law & Order: Trial by Jury.

Movies

Daly had starring roles in the 1966 beach party movie Out of Sight, and the 1967 World War II film The Young Warriors both for Universal Pictures. He filmed an unsuccessful slapstick comedy television pilot with Joan Staley called The Clumbsys.  Daly also appeared in the Walt Disney live action films Superdad, The Strongest Man in the World,  The Shaggy D.A., and Amy.

Writer

Daly wrote for the 1975 Andy Griffith series Adams of Eagle Lake''.

References

External links
 
 
 The Start of Something Big - Interview with Jonathan Daly (2015)

1942 births
Living people
American male television actors
American male film actors
American male comedians
20th-century American male actors
20th-century American comedians
21st-century American male actors
Male actors from Chicago
Comedians from Illinois